Beaver Township is one of the fifteen townships of Noble County, Ohio, United States.  The 2000 census found 758 people in the township, 658 of whom lived in the unincorporated portions of the township.

Geography
Located in the northeastern corner of the county, it borders the following townships:
Millwood Township, Guernsey County - north
Somerset Township, Belmont County - east
Seneca Township, Monroe County - south
Marion Township - southwest
Wayne Township - west

The most easterly township in Noble County, it is the only county township to border Belmont County.

Batesville, the smallest village in Noble County, is located in central Beaver Township.

Name and history
Statewide, other Beaver Townships are located in Mahoning and Pike Counties, plus a Beavercreek Township in Greene County.

Government
The township is governed by a three-member board of trustees, who are elected in November of odd-numbered years to a four-year term beginning on the following January 1. Two are elected in the year after the presidential election and one is elected in the year before it. There is also an elected township fiscal officer, who serves a four-year term beginning on April 1 of the year after the election, which is held in November of the year before the presidential election. Vacancies in the fiscal officership or on the board of trustees are filled by the remaining trustees.

References

External links
Noble County Chamber of Commerce 

Townships in Noble County, Ohio
Townships in Ohio